Avignonet is a railway station in Avignonet, Occitanie, southern France. Within TER Occitanie, it is part of line 10 (Toulouse–Narbonne).

References

Railway stations in Haute-Garonne